Eduard "Edi" Glieder (born 28 January 1969) is an Austrian former professional footballer played as a forward.

Career statistics

Club

International

Honours
Austria Salzburg
 Austrian Bundesliga winner: 1994–95, 1996–97
 Austrian Supercup winner: 1997
 Austrian Bundesliga top scorer: 1998–99 (22 goals)

Tirol Innsbruck
 Austrian Bundesliga winner: 1999–2000, 2000–01, 2001–02

Background
His youth club St. Margarethen renamed its stadium to "Edi-Glieder Stadion" in June 2001.

References

1969 births
Living people
Austrian footballers
Association football forwards
Austria international footballers
Grazer AK players
FC Red Bull Salzburg players
FC Schalke 04 players
FC Kärnten players
Austrian Football Bundesliga players
2. Liga (Austria) players
Bundesliga players
Austrian expatriate footballers
Austrian expatriate sportspeople in Germany
Expatriate footballers in Germany
SK Vorwärts Steyr managers
FC Tirol Innsbruck players